A sarabande is a type of dance music in triple meter.

Sarabande and Sarabandes may also refer to:

Sarabande (album), by Jon Lord
Sarabande Books, an American publisher
Sarabandes (Satie), set of solo piano pieces written by Erik Satie
"Sarabande", a movement of Keyboard suite in D minor (HWV 437) composed by George Frideric Handel
Varèse Sarabande, an American record label
William Sarabande, American author

See also
Sarabanda, an Italian television show 1997-2017